Whaikaha - Ministry of Disabled People is a government ministry within New Zealand's Ministry of Social Development. Its mission is to improve outcomes for disabled people in New Zealand, reform the wider disability system, and coordinate the Government's disability policies. Whaikaha formally came into existence on 1 July 2022.

History

Background
On 29 October 2021, Minister for Disability Issues Carmel Sepuloni and Minister of Health Andrew Little announced that the New Zealand Government would establish a new Ministry for Disabled People within the Ministry of Social Development to reform the country's disability support system and improve outcomes for disabled people. Sepuloni justified the creation of the new ministry on the grounds that the current disability system in New Zealand had "broken down" and that consolidating these services within a single agency would improve disabled people's outcomes. 

The proposed disability ministry and legislative framework were welcomed by Disability Rights Commissioner Paula Tesoriero, Te Ao Mārama chair Tristram Ingham, New Zealand Disability Support Network chief executive Peter Reynolds, and the Green Party's disability spokesperson Jan Logie. Disabled Person Assembly chief executive Prudence Walker welcomed the Government's efforts to prioritise the needs of disabled people but expressed concerns about funding and the need for disabled leadership of the new entity.

Launch
On 19 May 2022, the Government allocated NZ$108 million from the 2022 New Zealand budget to establishing the new ministry. Sepuloni stated that the new ministry would be responsible for leading and coordinating strategic disability policy across the New Zealand Government, reforming the wider disability system, and improving disabled outcomes in the areas of employment, education, health and wellbeing.

On 1 July 2022, Minister for Social Development Carmel Sepuloni and Minister for Disability Issues Poto Williams formally launched the new government department as Whaikaha - Ministry of Disabled People.  During the official launch, it was confirmed that Whaikaha would be the first government department with names in the country's three official languages: English, Māori, and New Zealand Sign Language. They also confirmed that the organisation's chief executive would be a disabled person. Since the candidate was unavailable due to personal circumstances, Geraldine Woods was designated as the interim chief executive. Williams was also designated as the Minister responsible for the new organisation. Whaikaha also assumed the functions formerly delivered by the Ministry of Health's Disability Directorate. It was also tasked with reforming New Zealand's disability system in line with the Government's Enabling Good Lives (EGL) approach.

Paula Tesoriero was announced as the first chief executive of Whaikaha on 30 August 2022 and is the first disabled person to lead a New Zealand public service department.

Notes and references

2022 establishments in New Zealand
Disability organisations based in New Zealand
Social security in New Zealand
New Zealand Public Service departments